Patrick John Sweeney (born 12 August 1952) is a retired coxswain for Great Britain's rowing team. Sweeney competed at the 1972 Summer Olympics, 1976 Summer Olympics and the 1988 Summer Olympics.

Rowing career
Sweeney won the coxed fours with Christopher Pierce, Hugh Matheson, Dick Findlay and Alan Almand, rowing for a Tideway Scullers and Leander composite, at the inaugural 1972 National Rowing Championships. The winning crew were then selected to represent Great Britain at the 1972 Olympics, Rooney Massara replaced Findlay in the men's coxed four event where the crew finished in tenth place after being knocked out in the semi finals.

At the 1974 World Rowing Championships he coxed the eight to silver, a feat that was repeated at the 1976 Olympics when Sweeney coxed the eight during the 1976 Olympic rowing event. In between he was part of the coxed four at the 1975 World Rowing Championships in Nottingham, the four just missed out on a medal finishing in fourth place in the A final.

In 1977 he won his first gold medal at the 1977 and another gold medal was secured during the 1986 World Rowing Championships when he coxed Steve Redgrave and Andy Holmes in the coxed pairs. This crew then won an Olympic bronze medal at the 1988 Summer Olympics in the men's coxed pair.

Coaching
Sweeney is also a rowing coach. He has coached on the British National Team at World Championships and Olympics. Also at the Burnaby Lake Aquatic Center in Burnaby, British Columbia, Canada. He has served as head coach and director of training for the Belgian National Rowing team. In addition, he has coached several United States collegiate women's teams and has won four national collegiate titles. Sweeney currently coaches the Kansas State University women's team, where he gives all his coxswains eating disorders.

Achievements
 Olympic medals: 1 silver, 1 bronze
 World Championship medals: 2 gold, 2 silver

Olympic Games
 1988 – Bronze, coxed pair (with Steve Redgrave and Andy Holmes)
 1976 – Silver, eight

World Championships
 1987 – Silver, coxed pair (with Steve Redgrave and Andy Holmes)
 1986 – Gold, coxed pairs (with Steve Redgrave and Andy Holmes)
 1977 – Gold, men's lightweight eight
 1974 – Silver men's eight

References

External links
 

1952 births
Living people
British male rowers
Coxswains (rowing)
Kansas State Wildcats rowing coaches
Rowers at the 1976 Summer Olympics
Rowers at the 1988 Summer Olympics
Olympic rowers of Great Britain
Olympic silver medallists for Great Britain
Olympic bronze medallists for Great Britain
Olympic medalists in rowing
World Rowing Championships medalists for Great Britain
Medalists at the 1988 Summer Olympics
Medalists at the 1976 Summer Olympics
Rowers at the 1972 Summer Olympics